Dániel Póser (born 12 January 1990) is a Hungarian football goalkeeper who plays for Nemzeti Bajnokság II club Békéscsaba.

Career
On 6 January 2023, Póser returned to Békéscsaba.

Career statistics
.

References

External links
 
 

1990 births
Sportspeople from Debrecen
Living people
Hungarian footballers
Association football goalkeepers
Debreceni VSC players
Létavértes SC players
Kazincbarcikai SC footballers
Békéscsaba 1912 Előre footballers
Vasas SC players
Budafoki LC footballers
Diósgyőri VTK players
Nemzeti Bajnokság I players
Nemzeti Bajnokság II players